Crasnoarmeiscoe is a commune in Hînceşti District, Moldova. It is composed of two villages, Crasnoarmeiscoe and Tălăiești.

References

Communes of Hîncești District